Migojnice is a village on the right bank of the Savinja River in the Municipality of Žalec in east-central Slovenia. The area is part of the traditional region of Styria. The municipality is now included in the Savinja Statistical Region.

Name
The village was attested in written sources in 1265–67 as Makoyn, and in 1763–87 as Megoiniz. The origin of the name is unclear, but it may be derived from *Maligojnice (based on the personal name *Maligojь) with syncope of the second syllable (cf. Magozd < *Mal(i) gozd). If so, the name would originally mean 'place where Maligojь's people live'.

Church
The local church is dedicated to Our Lady of Lourdes and belongs to the Parish of Griže. It was built between 1888 and 1891.

References

External links
Migojnice at Geopedia

Populated places in the Municipality of Žalec